Chudamani Khadka is a Nepali politician and a member of the House of Representatives of the federal parliament of Nepal. He was elected under the proportional representation system from CPN (Maoist Center). He is also a member of the House Finance Committee. He used to be a personal aide to Pushpa Kamal Dahal before his election to parliament.

References

Living people
Nepal MPs 2017–2022
Nepal Communist Party (NCP) politicians
Communist Party of Nepal (Maoist Centre) politicians
1977 births